Bungalotis quadratum (common name - pallid scarlet-eye) is a butterfly in the family Hesperiidae  (subfamily - Eudaminae,  tribe - Eudamini). It was first described by Jan Sepp in (approximately) 1845 as Papilio quadratum.

It is found in the Americas.

References 

Hesperiidae
Taxa named by Jan Sepp